Members of the Northern Territory Legislative Assembly from 2012 to 2016 are listed below.

Notes
 On 25 January 2013, the Labor member for Wanguri and former Chief Minister of the Northern Territory, Paul Henderson, resigned. Labor candidate Nicole Manison won the by-election on 16 February 2013
 On 20 February 2014, the CLP member for Blain and former Chief Minister of the Northern Territory, Terry Mills, resigned. CLP candidate Nathan Barrett won the by-election on 12 April 2014.
 On 4 April 2014, CLP MLAs Alison Anderson (Namatjira), Francis Xavier Kurrupuwu (Arafura) and Larisa Lee (Arnhem) resigned from the party to sit as independents. On 27 April, it was announced that they had joined the Palmer United Party, with Anderson as leader of the party in the Territory.
 On 8 September 2014, Palmer United MLA Francis Xavier Kurrupuwu (Arafura) resigned from the PUP and returned to the CLP.
 On 18 September 2014, the Labor member for Casuarina, Kon Vatskalis, resigned. Labor candidate Lauren Moss won the resulting by-election on 18 October 2014.
 On 29 November 2014, the Palmer United Party's two MLAs, Alison Anderson and Larisa Lee, announced that they would quit the PUP and return to their former status as independent MLAs.
 On 17 June 2015, CLP MLA Robyn Lambley (Araluen) resigned from the CLP to sit as an independent.
 On 20 July 2015, CLP MLA Kezia Purick (Goyder) resigned from the CLP to sit as an independent.
 On 10 October 2015, Labor MLA Delia Lawrie (Karama) resigned from the party to sit as an independent following her loss of preselection for 2016.
 On 28 June 2016, CLP MLA Nathan Barrett resigned from the party to sit as an independent.

See also
2012 Northern Territory general election

Members of Northern Territory parliaments by term
21st-century Australian politicians